Padinjarangadi is located in the grama panchayath of Pattithara in Palakkad district of Kerala state, India.

References 

Cities and towns in Palakkad district